Events from the year 1694 in China.

Incumbents 
 Kangxi Emperor (33rd year)

Events 
 the three khans (Galdan Boshugtu Khan, et al.) of the Khalkha were formally inducted into the inner circles of the Qing aristocracy

Births
 Wang Jun (Qing dynasty) (1694–1751), scholar and historian, taught at the Anding Academy in Yangzhou
 Wang Anguo (1694–1757)

Deaths
 Noble Consort Wenxi, of the Niohuru clan (溫僖貴妃 鈕祜祿氏; d. 19 December 1694)

References

 
 .

 
China